South of Heaven, West of Hell is a 2000 American western film starring Dwight Yoakam, who also co-wrote, directed, and scored the film. The film follows Valentine Casey (Yoakam), a Marshal in the Arizona territory, when he receives a surprise visit from his outlaw adoptive father (Luke Askew) on Christmas Eve 1907. This stands as the only film Yoakam has written and directed.

The film premiered on the closing night of the 2000 Slamdance Film Festival, and released in theatres on December 15, 2000.

Plot

Cast
 Dwight Yoakam as Valentine Casey
 Billy Bob Thornton as Brigadier Smalls
 Vince Vaughn as Taylor Henry
 Bridget Fonda as Adalyne Dunfries
 Peter Fonda as Bill "Shoshonee Bill"
 Paul Reubens as Arvid Henry
 Bud Cort as Agent Otts
 Michael Jeter as Uncle Jude
 Bo Hopkins as Dr. Angus "Doc" Dunfries
 Luke Askew as Leland Henry
 Joe Ely as Paul "Petrified Paul"

Production
Shortly before production began, the financier backed out and Yoakam made the decision to finance the film on his own, partially through the sale of his home in Malibu. His production company (A Cast of Strays) ultimately filed for Chapter 11 bankruptcy protection, and several crew members registered complaints with unions and filed lawsuits in small claims court against the company. Yoakam said it was "the hardest experience I've ever gone through in my professional life in terms of executing art". To help pay off the debt accrued while making the movie, Yoakam hired a cheaper backing band in 2002, which resulted in a falling out with his longtime producer, bandleader, and guitarist Pete Anderson.

Reception
On Rotten Tomatoes, the film has a 14% approval rating, based on 7 reviews with an average rating of 3.50 out of 10. On Metacritic the film has a score of 22% based on reviews from 6 critics, indicating "generally unfavorable reviews".

Robert Koehler of Variety said that the film "lacks the critical ingredients of shape, consistent tone, rhythm and economy that would make this truly old-fashioned oater into a lean, compelling adventure". He added that "there's no grace to the interplay of images and emotions. At every step, the filmmakers seem unable to pull off an exaggerated horse opera, and they never know when to pull the plug on scenes that are going nowhere". Writing for Film Threat, Michael Dequina said in his review that "watching Yoakam's film...is like eating a shit sandwich. The title may be a cutesy joke describing someplace close to hell, but make no mistake—this film is hell."

References

External links

 
 

2000 films
2000 Western (genre) films
Films set in Arizona
Trimark Pictures films
Films set in 1907
2000 directorial debut films
2000s English-language films
American Western (genre) films
2000s American films